is a railway station in Yukuhashi, Fukuoka Prefecture, Japan. It is on the Tagawa Line, operated by the Heisei Chikuhō Railway. Trains arrive roughly every 30 minutes.

History
A station at this site was slated to open in 2018, but the 2018 Japan floods delayed construction until 2019. Due to the station being opened near the transition into the Reiwa era, the station appended "Reiwa" to the station name. Reiwa Costa Yukuhashi Station is also the first station opened during the Reiwa era.

The station is primarily made of locally acquired wood. The station building is built of hinoki cypress from the Keichiku area, while the floor and walls are built of Japanese cedar from the Chikuhō area. The station cost 96 million yen to complete.

References

External links
Reiwa Costa Yukuhashi Station (Heisei Chikuhō Railway website)

Railway stations in Fukuoka Prefecture
Railway stations in Japan opened in 2019
Heisei Chikuhō Railway Tagawa Line